Bidhand or Bid Hend or Bid Hand may refer to:

Bid Hend, Isfahan
Bidhand, Qom